Isabelle Alonso is a French writer of Spanish extraction. Her parents were exiled Spanish Republicans, and Alonso became a naturalized French citizen at the age of eight. She has published a series of books exploring her family history, among them L'Exil est mon pays (2006), Fille de rouge (2009) and Maman (2010).

References

French women writers
French writers
Living people
Year of birth missing (living people)